Timerssokatigigfik Nuuk Il (also known as Nuuk Idraetslag, NÛK or Nuuk IL) is a sports club from Greenland based in Nuuk. They compete in men's and women's association football and handball.

Honours

Football 
Coca Cola GM: 5
Champion : 1981, 1985, 1986, 1988, 1990
Coca Cola GM Womens: 4
Champion : 2001, 2002, 2004, 2005
second : 1997, 1998, 1999, 2003

Handball 
Greenlandic Men's Handball Championship: 11
Champion : 1978, 1991, 1994, 1995, 1996, 1997, 1998, 1999, 2001, 2002, 2004

Football clubs in Greenland
Association football clubs established in 1934
Sport in Nuuk
1934 establishments in Greenland
Handball clubs in Greenland